Helen Dimsdale, née Brown (2 July 1907 – 20 April 1977), was a British neurologist.

Life
Helen Easdale Dimsdale was born to a wealthy family on 2 July 1907 at Stretford, Lancashire, England. She took a first in the Natural Science Tripos at Girton College, Cambridge in 1929 and married Wilfrid Dimsdale the following year. They had one son together. She went to University College Hospital (UCH) for clinical studies where she received her M.B., B.Chir. degrees in 1937. She had house appointments at UCH and Elizabeth Garrett Anderson Hospital (EAGH) before she was appointed medical registrar at EAGH in 1938. Dimsdale trained throughout World War II at various hospitals in neuropathology until she became a consultant in 1946 at EAGH. The following year, she was appointed as a consultant at Maida Vale Hospital for Nervous Diseases and became the first woman to be appointed to a neurological consultancy in Britain. She received her M.A. and M.D. degrees in 1949. She also became a consultant at the Royal Free Hospital in 1950. Dimsdale continued to work at Maida Vale and the Royal Free until ill-health forced her retirement in 1967. She died on 20 April 1977

Activities
Dimsdale was medical tutor at the Royal Free from 1951 to 1954 as well as teaching there and at the Institute of Neurology. She served as an "examiner in neurology for the Diploma of Psychological Medicine at Durham University and for the Royal College of Physicians in medical ophthalmology. Dimsdale proved her administrative abilities when she served as chairman of the planning committee for the new Royal Free Hospital in the 1950s and as treasurer for the Association of British Neurologists (1961–1966)."

Notes

References

1907 births
1977 deaths
British neurologists
Alumni of the University of Cambridge